The 1868 United States presidential election in Tennessee took place on November 3, 1868, as part of the 1868 United States presidential election. Tennessee voters chose 10 representatives, or electors, to the Electoral College, who voted for president and vice president.

Tennessee was won by Ulysses S. Grant, formerly the 6th Commanding General of the United States Army (R-Illinois), running with Speaker of the House Schuyler Colfax, with 68.43% of the popular vote, against the 18th governor of New York, Horatio Seymour (D–New York), running with former Senator Francis Preston Blair, Jr., with 31.57% of the vote.

With 68.43% of the popular vote, Tennessee would be Grant's fourth strongest victory in terms of popular vote percentage after Vermont, Massachusetts and Kansas.

This was the last presidential election in which Tennessee would back the Republican nominee until 1920.

Results

References 

Tennessee
1868
1868 Tennessee elections